Peter Brennan may refer to:

 Peter Brennan (bobsleigh) (born 1942), American Olympic bobsledder
 Peter Brennan (producer), American television producer
 Peter J. Brennan (1918–1996), United States Secretary of Labor under Presidents Nixon and Ford
 Peter Brennan (Newfoundland politician) (1786–1887), Irish-born political figure in Newfoundland
 Peter Paul Brennan (1941–2016), bishop of the Ecumenical Catholic Diocese of the Americas
 Pete Brennan (1936–2012), American basketball player
 Peter M. Brennan, American diplomat